Jamie Michael How (born 19 May 1981) is a former cricketer who has played Test match, One Day International and Twenty20 International cricket for New Zealand. He attended Palmerston North Boys' High School. In New Zealand domestic cricket, he plays for and captains Central Districts. How is a steady scoring, right-handed opening batsman and occasional off-spin bowler. He made his first-class debut in 2000–2001 and his international debut in 2005–2006.

Domestic career
In 2013, in a List A match against Northern Districts, How scored 222 from 138 deliveries, becoming the second-equal highest scorer ever in List A cricket history.

International career
How forced his way into international contention through a series of good seasons for Central Districts. He made his international debut in a One Day International match against Sri Lanka in Queenstown on 31 December 2005.

How scored a brilliant 116-ball 139, his maiden ODI century, in chasing the massive total of 340 against England at Napier in 2008. How was eventually run out on the second-last ball of the New Zealand innings. The match was eventually tied.

He along with Peter Ingram set the record opening stand in T20 cricket in 2012 (201)

He was also selected to make his Test debut in the first Test against the West Indies on 9 March 2006 as an opening batsman. He struggled in his first few matches, failing to reach fifty in his first ten innings and was dropped from the team at the end of 2006. On his return to Tests in March 2007 – 2008, he posted his first half-century, a fluent 92 in the first Test against England at Hamilton. His second-innings 68 at Lord's a couple of months later laid the foundation for New Zealand to save the Test match.

Personal life
He attended Palmerston North Boys High School.

References

External links

 
https://www.nzcpa.co.nz/news/jamie-how-to-retire-after-ford-trophy-competition

1981 births
Living people
New Zealand cricketers
New Zealand One Day International cricketers
New Zealand Test cricketers
New Zealand Twenty20 International cricketers
Central Districts cricketers
Cricketers from New Plymouth
People educated at Palmerston North Boys' High School
Cricketers at the 2011 Cricket World Cup
North Island cricketers